The 2012–13 Cornwall Hockey Association Cup will be the 2012-13 season of the Cornwall Hockey Association Knockout Cup, known as the Cornwall Cup or CHA Cup.  The CHA Cup is the flagship competition organised by the Cornwall Hockey Association, contested by senior male and female hockey teams in the county of Cornwall.

Entries for the competition were confirmed in August 2012, with 35 (of a possible 36) teams representing all 12 clubs eligible to compete in the competition. The competition will begin in September 2012 with the Ladies Cup, Preliminary round and culminate with the Ladies Cup final in April 2013 at Penzance HC. Truro HC and Newquay HC are the respective defending champions of the Men's and Ladies Cups.

Format 
Both the Men's Cup and Ladies Cup are to be contested as knockout competitions, with a single defeat eliminating the losing team. A team which is defeated in, or prior to, Round 1 of the Cup competition will qualify for the 2012–13 Cornwall Hockey Association Plate.

2012-13 will see the draws for all rounds of the competitions made prior to the start of the tournament, thereby allowing teams to analyse their potential opponents in any subsequent rounds.

Teams and calendar

Men's Cup

15 (out of a possible 16) teams representing all seven eligible clubs entered the competition.   

Of the fifteen competing teams, fourteen were entered into Round 1 of the competition, with the seven winners joining defending champions, a first ranked team, Truro in the quarter finals.

Ladies Cup

All 20 teams, representing all twelve eligible clubs entered the Ladies Cup.
 

Of the twenty competing teams, eight were entered into a Preliminary round with the four winners joining the remaining twelve teams in Round 1.  The eight teams contesting the preliminary round were those teams ranked lowest based upon their finishing position in the 2011-12 league season.

Results and Fixtures
The draw for both the Men's Cup and Ladies' Cup was carried out on 25 July 2012.

Men's Cup

Ladies Cup

Preliminary round
The eight lowest ranked teams in the competition (based upon their finishing position in the 2011-12 league season) will contest the preliminary round. The draw was carried out at random.  Rankings are shown in parentheses.

Main Draw

References

External links 

 http://www.cornwallhockey.org/default.aspx?id=4

Cornwall Hockey Association Knockout Cup
2010s in Cornwall
2013 in English sport